The 2018 Cork Intermediate Hurling Championship was the 109th staging of the Cork Intermediate Hurling Championship since its establishment by the Cork County Board in 1909. The draw for the opening round fixtures took place on 10 December 2017. The championship began on 21 April 2018 and ended on 14 October 2018.

On 14 October 2018, Ballincollig won the championship after a 2-16 to 1-15 defeat of Blackrock in the final at Páirc Uí Chaoimh. It was their eighth championship title overall and their first title since 1999.

Ballincollig's Cian Dorgan was the championship's top scorer with 0-57.

Team changes

To Championship

Promoted from the Cork Junior A Hurling Championship
 St. Catherine's

From Championship

Promoted to the Cork Premier Intermediate Hurling Championship
 Aghada

Results

Preliminary round

Round 1

Round 2

Round 3

Relegation play-offs

Quarter-finals

Semi-finals

Final

Championship statistics

Top scorers

Overall

In a single game

References

External links

 2018 Cork Intermediate Hurling Championship fixtures and results 

Cork Intermediate Hurling Championship
Cork Intermediate Hurling Championship